Archibald "Archie" Howie  (born 8 March 1934) is a British physicist and Emeritus Professor at the University of Cambridge, known for his pioneering work on the interpretation of transmission electron microscope images of crystals. Born in 1934, he attended Kirkcaldy High School and the University of Edinburgh. He received his PhD from the University of Cambridge, where he subsequently took up a permanent post. He has been a fellow of Churchill College since its foundation, and was President of its Senior Combination Room (SCR) until 2010.

In 1965, with Hirsch, Whelan, Pashley and Nicholson, he published the seminal text Electron Microscopy of Thin Crystals. He was elected to the Royal Society in 1978 and awarded their Royal Medal in 1999. In 1992 he was awarded the Guthrie Medal and Prize. He was elected an Honorary Fellow of the Royal Society of Edinburgh in 1995. He was head of the Cavendish Laboratory from 1989 to 1997.

References

1934 births
Living people
British physicists
British materials scientists
Alumni of the University of Edinburgh
Fellows of the Royal Society
Commanders of the Order of the British Empire
Fellows of Churchill College, Cambridge
Microscopists
Royal Medal winners
Alumni of Trinity College, Cambridge
Fellows of the Royal Microscopical Society
Presidents of the International Federation of Societies for Microscopy
Scientists of the Cavendish Laboratory